The 2019–20 Baltic Men Volleyball League, known as Credit 24 Champions League for sponsorship reasons, was the 15th edition of the highest level of club volleyball in the Baltic states. The season was cancelled after the quarterfinals in the beginning of March 2020 due to the COVID-19 pandemic. Final four games were not played and medals were not awarded to the top teams.

Participating teams

The following teams took part in the 2019–20 edition of Baltic Men Volleyball League.

Venues, personnel and kits

Coaching changes

Regular season
All participating 9 clubs are playing according to the triple round robin system.

|}
Updated to match(es) played on 23 February 2020. Source: Credit24 Champions League Regular Season

Playoffs
The four winners of each series qualified to the Final four, while the other four teams were eliminated.

Final four
The Final four tournament was scheduled to be held at Kuressaare Sports Centre, Kuressaare, Estonia on 13 – 14 March 2020. The tournament was initially postponed due to escalation of the COVID-19 pandemic in Europe. A few days later it was announced that the season was cancelled after the quarterfinals due to the COVID-19 pandemic. Final four games were not played and medals were not awarded to the top teams.

Organizer: cancelled
Venue: cancelled

Semifinals

|}

3rd place match

|}

Final

|}

Final ranking

Final four awards

Most Valuable Player
   
Best Setter
   
Best Outside Hitters
   
   

Best Middle Blockers
    
   
Best Opposite Hitter
   
Best Libero

References

External links
Official website

Baltic Men Volleyball League
Baltic Men Volleyball League
Baltic Men Volleyball League
Baltic Men Volleyball League
Baltic Men Volleyball League
Baltic Men Volleyball League
Baltic Men Volleyball League
Baltic Men Volleyball League
Baltic